Ujina 3-chōme is a Hiroden station (tram stop) on Hiroden Ujina Line, located in Minami-ku, Hiroshima.

Routes
From Ujina 3-chōme Station, there are three of Hiroden Streetcar routes.

 Hiroshima Station - Hiroshima Port Route
 Hiroden-nishi-hiroshima - Hiroshima Port Route
 Hiroshima Station - (via Hijiyama-shita) - Hiroshima Port Route

Connections
█ Ujina Line
  
Ujina 2-chōme — Ujina 3-chōme — Ujina 4-chōme

Around station
ÆON Ujina Shopping Center
JUSCO Ujina
FamilyMart

History
Opened as "10-chome" on December 27, 1935.
Renamed to "Ujina 10-chome" on March 30, 1960.
Renamed to the present name "Ujina 3-chome" on September 1, 1968.

See also
Hiroden Streetcar Lines and Routes
List of railway stations in Japan

External links

Ujina 3-chome Station
Railway stations in Japan opened in 1935